SM UC-17 was a German Type UC II minelaying submarine or U-boat in the Imperial German Navy in World War I. She was ordered on 29 August 1915 and launched on 29 February 1916. She was commissioned into the Imperial German Navy on 21 July 1916 as SM UC-17.

In 21 patrols UC-17 was credited with sinking 96 ships by either torpedo or laying mines. They included the Royal Fleet Auxiliary munitions ship , which she torpedoed and sank in the English Channel on 26 March 1918.

Design
Like all pre-UC-25 German Type UC II submarines, UC-17 had a displacement of  when at the surface and  while submerged. The submarine was powered by two six-cylinder four-stroke diesel engines each producing  (a total of ), two electric motors producing , and two propeller shafts.

UC-17 was fitted with six  mine tubes, eighteen UC 200 mines, three  torpedo tubes (one on the stern and two on the bow), seven torpedoes, and one  Uk L/30 deck gun. Her complement was twenty-six crew members.

Fate
UC-17 was surrendered on 26 November 1918 and broken up at Preston in 1919–20.

Summary of raiding history

Notes

References

References

Ships built in Hamburg
German Type UC II submarines
U-boats commissioned in 1916
World War I minelayers of Germany
World War I submarines of Germany
1916 ships